Afrachal may refer to:
 Afrachal, Sari